Azam and Muazzam Khan, brothers who were archers and architects in the early 1400s
Mir Jumla II (1591–1663), known as Mu'azzam Khan, subahdar of Bengal in Eastern India under the Mughal Emperor Aurangze
Khizr Muazzam Khan, lawyer who, with his wife Ghazala, received international attention after a speech at the 2016 Democratic National Convention
Humayun Saqib Muazzam Khan, the son of Khizr and Ghazala Khan killed in action in 2004 during the Iraq War
Muazzam Mujahid Ali Khan, musician in the Rizwan-Muazzam group